The 2014 Malaysian Grand Prix, formally known as the 2014 Formula 1 Petronas Malaysia Grand Prix, was a Formula One motor race that was held on 30 March 2014 at the Sepang International Circuit in Selangor, Malaysia.

Report

Background
Like the 2013 Malaysian Grand Prix, tyre supplier Pirelli brought its orange-banded hard compound tyre as the harder "prime" tyre and the white-banded medium compound tyre as the softer "option" tyre.

Prior to the race, there was a minute's silence as a mark of respect to the passengers of Malaysia Airlines Flight 370, which disappeared over the Indian Ocean three weeks prior. Drivers also carried messages on their cars and helmets.

Qualifying
Lewis Hamilton put his Mercedes on pole position, the 33rd of his career. He thus equalled Jim Clark for most poles of a British Formula One driver. Behind him was Red Bull Racing's Sebastian Vettel and Hamilton's teammate Nico Rosberg.

Race
Lewis Hamilton dominated the race, flying away at the start. Nico Hülkenberg also had a good start from seventh place, briefly battling with Kimi Räikkönen before getting stuck up behind Fernando Alonso. Sergio Pérez did not start the race due to a gearbox issue.

There was a first lap incident when Pastor Maldonado and Jules Bianchi collided with one another, effectively ending the race for both of the drivers when they received mechanical complications. Bianchi would later receive a penalty for his actions despite Marussia officials' claims that the incident was due to a collision with Toro Rosso's Jean-Éric Vergne hitting the back of the Marussia. At the end of the first lap, the top four – Hamilton, Nico Rosberg, Sebastian Vettel and Daniel Ricciardo – had effectively escaped the rest of the pack and the grid was unchanged until the last ten laps of the race.

Hülkenberg fought a lengthy battle with Alonso for fourth place, ultimately losing it due to Alonso's fresh tyres, as Force India were the only team in the top five to have successfully executed a two-stop pit strategy, while the others stuck to three stops. Felipe Massa, Valtteri Bottas and Jenson Button battled for sixth place, during which Massa received the radio message, "Felipe, Valtteri is faster than you," reminding him of his years as a number-two driver for Ferrari.

Both the Saubers of Adrian Sutil and Esteban Gutiérrez had retired after Sutil experienced an electrical failure and Gutiérrez experienced a gearbox failure, preventing him from getting out of neutral gear. Ricciardo was having a good race until his third pit-stop, when he was released before his left-front tyre was correctly fastened. He then had to be pushed back into the pits. He then experienced the failure of his front wing, leading him to make the decision to retire.

Räikkönen had a terrible race from the start after Kevin Magnussen's McLaren clipped his right rear tyre going into the first corner on lap 2, causing a puncture. He ultimately finished twelfth, 0.1 seconds behind the Lotus of Romain Grosjean. Hamilton led every lap of the race and set the fastest lap and thus took the first Grand Chelem of his career, giving Mercedes their first 1-2 finish since the 1955 Italian Grand Prix, after Rosberg finished second and Vettel third. Alonso came in fourth after a last-lap battle with Hülkenberg who finished fifth, almost forty seconds ahead of McLaren's Jenson Button, who was able to hold off both of Williams' drivers, Massa and Bottas, who finished seventh and eighth respectively giving Williams a one-point lead over Force India. Magnussen finished ninth for McLaren and the top ten was completed by Daniil Kvyat of Toro Rosso. Kamui Kobayashi  and Marcus Ericsson finished thirteenth and fourteenth for Caterham, effectively putting them ahead of Marussia in the Constructors' Championship standings.

Post-race
Daniel Ricciardo was given a 10-place grid penalty for the  after the Red Bull Racing team released his car in an unsafe manner from his pit box. Kevin Magnussen and Jules Bianchi both received two penalty points each, along with Valtteri Bottas after Bottas was accused of impeding Ricciardo during qualifying.

Classification

Qualifying

Notes
  — Valtteri Bottas was given a three-place grid penalty for impeding Daniel Ricciardo during qualifying.

Race

Championship standings after the race

Drivers' Championship standings

Constructors' Championship standings

 Note: Only the top five positions are included for both sets of standings.

References

External links

Malaysian
Malaysian Grand Prix
Grand Prix
Malaysian Grand Prix